The Honda CB750 is an air-cooled, transverse, in-line four-cylinder engine motorcycle made by Honda over several generations for year models 1969–2003 as well as 2007 with an upright or standard riding posture. It is often called the original Universal Japanese Motorcycle (UJM).

Though other manufacturers had marketed the transverse, overhead camshaft, inline four-cylinder engine configuration and the layout had been used in racing engines prior to World War II, Honda popularized the configuration with the CB750, and the layout subsequently became the dominant sport bike engine layout.

The CB750 is included in the AMA Motorcycle Hall of Fame Classic Bikes; was named in the Discovery Channel's "Greatest Motorbikes Ever"; was in The Art of the Motorcycle exhibition, and is in the UK National Motor Museum. The Society of Automotive Engineers of Japan, Inc. rates the 1969 CB750 as one of the 240 Landmarks of Japanese Automotive Technology.

The CB750 was the first motorcycle to be called a "superbike".

History
Honda of Japan introduced the CB750 motorcycle to the US and European markets in 1969 after experiencing success with its smaller motorcycles.  In the late 1960s Honda motorcycles were, overall, the world's biggest sellers. There were the C100 Cub step-through—the best-selling motorcycle of all time—the C71, C72, C77 and CA77/8 Dreams; and the CB72/77 Super Hawks/Sports. A taste of what was ahead came with the introduction of the revolutionary CB450 DOHC twin-cylinder machine in 1966. Profits from these production bikes financed the successful racing machines of the 1960s, and lessons learned from racing were applied to the CB750. The CB750 was targeted directly at the US market after Honda officials, including founder Soichiro Honda, repeatedly met US dealers and understood the opportunity for a larger bike.

Early racing
In 1967 American Honda's service manager Bob Hansen flew to Japan and discussed with Soichiro Honda the possibility of using Grand Prix technology in bikes prepared for American motorcycle events. American racing's governing body, the AMA, had rules that allowed racing by production machines only, and restricted overhead-valve engines to 500 cc whilst allowing the side-valve Harley Davidsons to compete with 750 cc engines. Honda knew that what won on the race track today, sold in the show rooms tomorrow, and a large engine capacity road machine would have to be built to compete with the Harley Davidson and Triumph twin-cylinder machines.

Hansen told Soichiro Honda that he should build a 'King of Motorcycles' and the CB750 appeared at the Tokyo Show in November 1968 and was publicly launched in UK at the Brighton, England motorcycle show held at the Metropole Hotel exhibition centre during April 1969, with an earlier press-launch at Honda's London headquarters, the pre-production versions appearing with a high and very wide handlebar intended for the US market.

The AMA Competition Committee recognised the need for more variation of racing motorcycle and changed the rules from 1970, by standardizing a full 750 cc displacement for all engines regardless of valve location or number of cylinders, enabling Triumph and BSA to field their 750 cc triples instead of the 500 cc Triumph Daytona twins.

The Honda factory responded by producing four works-racer CR750s, a racing version of the production CB750, ridden by UK-based Ralph Bryans, Tommy Robb and Bill Smith under the supervision of Mr Nakamura, and a fourth machine under Hansen ridden by Dick Mann. The three Japanese-prepared machines all failed during the race with Mann just holding on to win by a few seconds with a failing engine.

Hansen's race team's historic victory at the March 1970 Daytona 200 with Dick Mann riding a tall-geared CR750 to victory preceded the June 1970 Isle of Man TT races when two 'official' Honda CB750s were entered, again ridden by Irishman Tommy Robb partnered in the team by experienced English racer John Cooper. The machines were entered into the 750 cc Production Class, a category for road-based machines allowing a limited number of strictly-controlled modifications. They finished in eighth and ninth places. Cooper was interviewed in UK monthly magazine Motorcycle Mechanics, stating both riders were unhappy with their poor-handling Hondas, and that he would not ride in the next year's race "unless the bikes have been greatly improved".

In 1973, Japanese rider Morio Sumiya finished in sixth place in the Daytona 200-Mile race on a factory 750.

Production and reception

Under development for a year, the CB750 had a transverse, straight-four engine with a single overhead camshaft (SOHC) and a front disc brake, neither of which was previously available on a mainstream, affordable, production motorcycle. Having a four-cylinder engine and disc brake, along with the introductory price of US$ (US$ in current money), gave the CB750 a considerable sporting performance advantage over its competition, particularly its British rivals.

Cycle magazine called the CB750, "the most sophisticated production bike ever", on the bike's introduction. Cycle World called it a masterpiece, highlighting Honda's painstaking durability testing, the bike's  top speed, the fade-free braking, the comfortable ride, and excellent instrumentation.

The CB750 was the first modern four-cylinder machine from a mainstream manufacturer, and the term superbike was coined to describe it. Adding to the bike's value were its electric starter, kill switch, dual mirrors, flashing turn signals, easily maintained valves, and overall smoothness and low vibration both under way and at a standstill. Much-later models from 1991 included maintenance-free hydraulic valves.

Unable to accurately gauge demand for the new bike, Honda limited its initial investment in the production dies for the CB750 by using a technique called permanent mold casting (often erroneously referred to as sandcasting) rather than diecasting for the engines – unsure of the bike's reception. The bike remained in the Honda line up for ten years, with a production total over 400,000.

Models

Note: All CB750 engines are air/oil-cooled, as opposed to liquid-cooled

SOHC
Year and model code:
 1969 CB750 (6 June), CB750K or CB750K0 (date unknown)
 1970 CB750K1 (21 September)
 1972 CB750K2 (US 1 March)
 1973 CB750K3 (US-only 1 February. K2 elsewhere)
 1974 CB750K4 (US/Japan-only, K2 elsewhere)
 1975 CB750K5 (US-only, K2/K4 elsewhere), CB750FO, CB750A (Canada-only)  The 1975 CB750F had a more streamlined look, thanks in part to a 4-into-1 exhaust and cafe style seat with fiberglass rear. Other changes included the use of a rear disc brake and a lighter crankshaft and flywheel. 
 1976 CB750K6, CB750F1, CB750A
 1977 CB750K7, CB750F2, CB750A1
 1978 CB750K8 (US-only), CB750F3, CB750A2

DOHC
 1979–1982 CB750K
 1979 CB750K 10th Anniversary Edition (5,000 produced for US)
 1979–1982 CB750F
 1980–1983 CB750C "Custom"
 1982–1983 CB750SC Nighthawk
 1984–1985 CB750SC Nighthawk "S" in Canada
 1984–1986 CB700SC Nighthawk "S" in US
 1984–1986 CB750SC Nighthawk (Horizon in Japan) 
 1992–1997 CB750F2
 1991–2003 CB750 Nighthawk
 2007 CB750 (Japan-only)

CB750A Hondamatic

In 1976, Honda introduced the CB750A to the United States, with the A suffix designating "Automatic", for its automatic transmission. Although the two-speed transmission includes a torque converter typical of an automatic transmission, the transmission does not automatically change gears for the rider. Each gear is selected by a foot-controlled hydraulic valve/selector (similar in operation to a manual transmission motorcycle). The foot selector controls the application of high pressure oil to a single clutch pack (one clutch for each gear), causing the selected clutch (and gear) to engage. The selected gear remains selected until changed by the rider, or the kickstand is lowered (which shifts the transmission to neutral).

The CB750A was sold in the North American and Japanese markets only. The name Hondamatic was shared with Honda cars of the 1970s, but the motorcycle transmission was not fully automatic. The design of the transmission is similar in concept to the transmission in Honda's N360AT, a kei car sold in Japan from 1967 to 1972.

The CB750A uses the same engine as the CB750, but detuned with lower 7.7:1 compression and smaller carburetors producing a lower output, . The same oil is used for the engine and transmission, and the engine was changed to a wet sump instead of dry sump type. A lockout safety device prevents the transmission from moving out of neutral if the side stand is down. There is no tachometer but the instruments include a fuel gauge and gear indicator. For 1977 the gearing was revised, and the exhaust changed to a four-into-two with a silencer on either side. Due to slow sales the model was discontinued in 1978, though Honda did later introduce smaller Hondamatic motorcycles (namely the CB400A, CM400A, and CM450A).

Nighthawk 750

From 1982 through 2003, with the exception of several years, Honda produced a CB750 known as the Nighthawk 750. Early models were designated the CB750SC Nighthawk while later models were simply known as the Nighthawk 750. The Nighthawk 750SC had a 4-stroke engine with a 5-speed manual transmission, chain drive, and front disc and rear drum brakes.

2007 CB750

In 2007 Honda Japan announced the sale of a new CB750 very similar to the models sold in the 1970s. Announced as the CB750 Special Edition that was in the silver colors of the CB750 AMA racer of the 1970s and the CB750, it was offered in three color schemes reminiscent of CB750s previously sold. , these bikes were intended only for release in Japan.

Specifications

References

External links

CB750 images at the 1969 Brighton Motorcycle Show

CB750
Sport bikes
Standard motorcycles
Motorcycles introduced in 1969

pt:Honda CB 750 Four